Taishanese, alternatively romanized in Cantonese as Toishanese or Toisanese, in local dialect as Hoisanese or Hoisan-wa, is a variety of Yue Chinese native to Taishan, Guangdong. Although it is related to Cantonese, Taishanese has little mutual intelligibility with the latter. Taishanese is also spoken throughout Sze Yup (which includes Taishan), located on the western fringe of the Pearl River Delta in Guangdong China. In the late 19th century and early 20th century, most of the Chinese emigration to North America originated from Sze Yup (or Siyi in the pinyin romanization of Standard Mandarin Chinese), the area where this variety is natively spoken. Thus, up to the mid-20th century, Taishanese was the dominant variety of the Chinese language spoken in Chinatowns in Canada and the United States. It was formerly the lingua franca of the overseas Chinese residing in the United States.

Names 
The earliest linguistic studies refer to the dialect of Llin-nen or Xinning. Xinning was renamed Taishan in 1914, and linguistic literature has since generally referred to the local dialect as the Taishan dialect, a term based on the pinyin romanization of Standard Mandarin Chinese pronunciation. Alternative names have also been used. The term Toishan is a convention used by the United States Postal Service, the Defense Language Institute and the 2000 United States Census. The terms Toishan, Toisan, and Toisaan are all based on Cantonese pronunciation and are also frequently found in linguistic and non-linguistic literature. Hoisan is a term based on the local pronunciation, although it is not generally used in published literature.

These terms have also been anglicized with the suffix -ese: Taishanese, Toishanese, and Toisanese. Of the previous three terms, Taishanese is most commonly used in academic literature, to about the same extent as the term Taishan dialect. The terms Hoisanese and Hoisan-wa do appear in print literature, although they are used more on the internet.

Another term used is Sìyì (Sze Yup or Seiyap in Cantonese romanization).  Sìyì or Sze Yup refers to a previous administrative division in the Pearl River Delta consisting of the four counties of Taishan, Kaiping, Enping and Xinhui. In 1983, a fifth county (Heshan) was added to the Jiangmen prefecture; so whereas the term Sìyì has become an anachronism, the older term Sze Yup remains in current use in overseas Chinese communities where it is their ancestral home.  The term Wuyi, literally "five counties", refers to the modern administrative region, but this term is not used to refer to Taishanese.

History 
Taishanese originates from the Taishan region, where it is spoken. Taishanese can also be seen as a group of very closely related, mutually intelligible dialects spoken in the various towns and villages in and around Siyi (the four counties of Toishan, Hoiping, Yanping, Sunwui, phonetized in Cantonese; while "Taishan, Kaiping, Enping and Xinhui" as above, is phonetizied in Mandarin).

A vast number of Taishanese immigrants journeyed worldwide through the Taishan diaspora. The Taishan region was a major source of Chinese immigrants through continental Americas from the late-19th to mid-20th centuries. Taishanese was the predominant dialect spoken by the 19th-century Chinese builders of railroads in North America. Approximately 1.3 million people are estimated to have origins in Taishan. Prior to the signing of the Immigration and Naturalization Act of 1965, which allowed new waves of Chinese immigrants, Taishanese was the dominant dialect spoken in Chinatowns across North America.

Taishanese is still spoken in many Chinatowns throughout North America, including those of San Francisco, Oakland, Los Angeles, New York City, Boston, Vancouver, Toronto, Chicago, and Montreal by older generations of Chinese immigrants and their children, but is today being supplanted by mainstream Cantonese and increasingly by Mandarin in both older and newer Chinese communities alike, across the continent.

Relationship with Cantonese 
Taishanese is a dialect of the Yue branch of Chinese, which also includes Cantonese.  However, due to ambiguities in the meaning of "Cantonese" in the English language, as it can refer to both the greater Yue dialect group or its prestige standard (Standard Cantonese), "Taishanese" and "Cantonese" are commonly used in mutually exclusive contexts, i.e. Taishanese is treated separately from "Cantonese". Despite the closeness of the two, they are hardly mutually intelligible.

The phonology of Taishanese bears a lot of resemblance to Cantonese, since both of them are part of the same Yue branch. Like other Yue dialects, such as the Goulou dialects, Taishanese pronunciation and vocabulary may sometimes differ greatly from Cantonese. Although Taishan stands only  from the city of Guangzhou, they are separated by numerous rivers, and the dialect of Taishan is among the most linguistically distant Yue dialects from the Guangzhou dialect.

Standard Cantonese functions as a lingua franca in Guangdong province, and speakers of other Chinese varieties (such as Chaozhou, Minnan, Hakka) living in Guangdong may also speak Cantonese. On the other hand, Standard Mandarin Chinese is the standard language of the People's Republic of China and the only legally allowed medium for teaching in schools throughout most of the country (except in minority areas), so residents of Taishan speak Mandarin as well. Although the Chinese government has been making great efforts to popularize Mandarin by administrative means, most Taishan residents do not speak Mandarin in their daily lives, but treat it as a second language, with Cantonese being the lingua franca of their region.

Phonology

Initial consonants
There are 19 to 23 initials consonants (or onsets) in Taishanese, which is shown in the chart below in IPA:

The respective nasal onsets (and ) are allophones of the pre-nasalized voiced stop onsets (and ). The velar nasal (ŋ) sound  occurs in both syllable initial and syllable final positions. There is a tendency toward denasalization for initial ŋ as in 耳 /ŋi/ [ŋgi] ‘ear’, 飲/饮 /ŋim/ [ŋgim] ‘to drink’，魚 /ŋuy/ [ŋgui] ‘fish’ and 月 /ŋut/ [ŋgut] ‘moon’. In words like 牙 /ŋa/ ‘tooth’ and 我 /ŋoy/, denasalization does not seem to take place. In syllable final position following the rounded vowel [o], /ŋ/ is usually modified by a lip-rounding. Examples are: 東 uŋ ‘east’ and、紅Huŋ ‘red’.
The palatal sibilants (and ) are allophones of the respective alveolar sibilants (and ) when the first vowel of the final consonant is high ( and ).
The palatal approximate is an allophone of the voiced fricative sibilant initial.
The palatal approximate can be a semivowel of the vowel  when used as a glide.
The labio-velar approximate can be a semivowel of the vowel  when used as a glide.

Vowels

There are about seven different vowels in Taishanese:

The closed front vowel can be a palatal approximant as a semivowel.
The closed back vowel can be a labiovelar approximant as a semivowel.
The rounding of the schwa  is variable.

Final consonants

The final consonant (or rime) occurs after the initial sound, which consists of a medial, a nucleus, and a coda.

Tones 
Taishanese is tonal. There are five contrastive lexical tones: high, mid, low, mid falling, and low falling. In at least one Taishanese dialect, the two falling tones have merged into a low falling tone. There is no tone sandhi.

Taishanese has four changed tones: mid rising, low rising, mid dipping and low dipping. These tones are called changed tones because they are the product of morphological processes (e.g. pluralization of pronouns) on four of the lexical tones. These tones have been analyzed as the addition of a high floating tone to the end of the mid, low, mid falling and low falling tones. The high endpoint of the changed tone often reaches an even higher pitch than the level high tone; this fact has led to the proposal of an expanded number of pitch levels for Taishanese tones. The changed tone can change the meaning of a word, and this distinguishes the changed tones from tone sandhi, which does not change a word's meaning. An example of a changed tone contrast is 刷  (to brush) and 刷  (a brush).

Writing system 
The writing system is Chinese. Historically, the common written language of Classical Literary Chinese united and facilitated cross-dialect exchange in dynastic China, as opposed to the spoken dialects which were too different to be mutually intelligible. In the 20th century, standard written Chinese, based on Mandarin, was codified as the new written standard. As Taishanese is primarily used in speech, characters needed specifically for writing Taishanese are not standardized and may vary. Commonly seen alternatives are shown below.

The sound represented by the IPA symbol  (the voiceless alveolar lateral fricative) is particularly challenging, as it has no standard romanization. The digraph "lh" used above to represent this sound is used in Totonac, Chickasaw and Choctaw, which are among several written representations in the languages that include the sound. The alternative "hl" is used in Xhosa and Zulu, while "ll" is used in Welsh. Other written forms occur as well.

The following chart compares the personal pronouns among Taishanese, Cantonese, and Mandarin. In Taishanese, the plural forms of the pronouns are formed by changing the tone, whereas in Cantonese and Mandarin, a plural marker (地/哋/等 dei6 and / men, respectively) is added.

See also 

 Varieties of Chinese
 Cantonese culture

References 

 
 
 
 
 
 
 
 
 
 
 
 
 
 
  (Ph.D. Dissertation)
 
 
  (Ph.D. Dissertation)
 
 
 
 
 
 
  (Ph.D. Dissertation)
 
 
Notes

External links 
  Taishanese Resources Website
  Taishanese Language Blog
  Taishanese Language Blog
  You can download the Defense Language Institute's 'Chinese-Cantonese (Toishan) Basic Course' audio and text material here
Chinese Character to Taishanese Lookup tool 
Gene M. Chin. "Hoisanva Sites". Alphabetical Dictionary and Lessons.

Yue Chinese
Taishan, Guangdong
Languages of China
Siyi

es:Dialecto taishanés